Saeed Mohsen Ali  (Born 22 January 1982) is an Iraqi football player who currently plays for Najaf FC in Iraq

Coaching career

Al-Diwaniya FC

Mohsen began his coaching career as an assistant to the Iraqi Hamid Rahim in Al-Diwaniya FC club, first coaching experience for the past player.

Managerial statistics

Honours

Club
Naft Al-Wasat
 Iraqi Premier League: 2014–15

External links
 
 Profile on Goalzz.com

Iraqi footballers
Iraq international footballers
Iraqi expatriate footballers
Living people
1982 births
Expatriate footballers in the United Arab Emirates
Expatriate footballers in Bahrain
Iraqi expatriate sportspeople in Bahrain
Al Jazira Club players
UAE Pro League players
Association football midfielders
Najaf FC players
Bahrain SC players